Fosselvi is a river in Årdal Municipality in Vestland county, Norway.

See also
List of rivers in Norway

References

External links

Rivers of Vestland
Utladalen
Vettisfossen
Rivers of Norway